Charles K. Orsborn (November 17, 1917 – May 7, 2017), known as "Chuck" or "Ozzy," was an American college basketball player, head coach, and the athletic director of Bradley University.

Playing career and World War II

Orsborn was a four-sport athlete at Bradley. He played basketball for Bradley from 1935 to 1939 and was part of the “Famous Five” teams that launched the school to prominence. While Orsborn was on the team, the Braves played in the first two National Invitation Tournaments in 1938 and 1939 and were invited to the NCAA tournament in 1939.

Orsborn was drafted by the New York Yankees in 1939 and played one season in the minor leagues with the Neosho Yankees. In 1941 he enlisted in the Army Air Corps, serving five years and attaining the rank of Lieutenant Colonel.

Coaching career

Orsborn returned to Bradley as an assistant coach from 1947 to 1956, which included two NCAA runner-up finishes. In 1956, he was elevated to head coach. From 1956 to 1965, he compiled a won-loss record of 194-56 (.774). During this time, the Braves won three NIT championships. During this nine-year span, the Braves also earned six Associated Press top 20 finishes, Orsborn was named Missouri Valley Conference coach of the year in 1960 and 1962. Orsborn also has the distinction of recording his first 100 victories in 120 games, which is sixth on the all-time list for college coaches.

In 1965, Orsborn took the position of Bradley's director of athletics and served in that function until 1978.

Later life

Orsborn was inducted into the N.I.T., MVC, and Greater Peoria halls of fame and was named Bradley's "Coach of the Century" in 2002. He also has an award named after him: "The Charles Orsborn Award" given to the Bradley senior who best exemplifies outstanding achievement in athletics and academics.

Orsborn, who was in poor health in his final years, died in Naples, Florida on May 7, 2017 at the age of 99. He was preceded in death by his wife and two sons and was survived by his daughter.

References

1917 births
2017 deaths
American men's basketball players
Bradley Braves athletic directors
Bradley Braves baseball players
Bradley Braves football players
Bradley Braves men's basketball coaches
Bradley Braves men's basketball players
College men's basketball head coaches in the United States
United States Army Air Forces officers
Neosho Yankees players